Hecuba (also Hecabe;) was a queen in Greek mythology, the wife of King Priam of Troy during the Trojan War.

Description 
Hecuba was described by the chronicler Malalas in his account of the Chronography as "dark, good eyes, full grown, long nose, beautiful, generous, talkative, calm". Meanwhile, in the account of Dares the Phrygian, she was illustrated as ". . .beautiful, her figure large, her complexion dark. She thought like a man and was pious and just."

Family

Parentage 
Ancient sources vary as to the parentage of Hecuba. According to Homer, Hecuba was the daughter of King Dymas of Phrygia, but Euripides and Virgil write of her as the daughter of the Thracian king Cisseus. The mythographers Pseudo-Apollodorus and Hyginus leave open the question which of the two was her father, with Pseudo-Apollodorus adding a third alternative option: Hecuba's parents could as well be the river god Sangarius and Metope.

Some versions from non-extant works are summarized by a scholiast on Euripides' Hecuba: according to those, she was a daughter of Dymas or Sangarius by the Naiad Euagora, or by Glaucippe the daughter of Xanthus (Scamander?); the possibility of her being a daughter of Cisseus is also discussed. A scholiast on Homer relates that Hecuba's parents were either Dymas and the nymph Eunoe or Cisseus and Telecleia; the latter option would make her a full sister of Theano, which is also noted by the scholiast on Euripides cited above.

According to Suetonius in The Twelve Caesars, the emperor Tiberius pestered scholars with obscure questions about ancient mythology, with one of his favorites being "Who was Hecuba's mother?"

Offspring 

Hecuba had 19 children, some of which included major characters of Homer's Iliad such as the warriors Hector and Paris, as well as the prophetess Cassandra. Two of them, Hector and Troilus, are said to have been born as a result of Hecuba's relationship with the god Apollo. Other named children of Hecuba by Priam are Helenus, Deiphobus, Laodice, Polyxena, Creusa, Polydorus, Polites, Antiphus, Pammon, Hipponous and Iliona.

Myths

Hecuba in the Iliad 

Hecuba appears six times in the Iliad. In Book 6.326–96, she meets Hector upon his return to the city and offers him the libation cup, instructing him to offer it to Zeus and to drink from it himself. Taking Hector's advice, she chooses a gown taken from Alexander's treasure to give as an offering to the goddess and leads the Trojan women to the temple of Athena to pray for help. In Book 22, she pleads with Hector not to fight Achilles, expressing her premonition of "never get[ting] to mourn you laid out on a bier." In Book 24.201–16, she is stricken with anxiety upon hearing of Priam's plan to retrieve Hector's body from Achilles' hut. Further along in the same episode, at 24.287–98, she offers Priam the libation cup and instructs him to pray to Zeus so that he may receive a favourable omen upon setting out towards the Achaean camp.  Unlike in the first episode in which Hector refuses her offer of the cup, Priam accepts and is rewarded with the requested omen. Finally, she laments Hector's death in a well-known speech at 24.748–59.

Hecuba in other classical works 
Stesichorus states that after the sack of Troy, Apollo, Hecuba's former lover, took her to safety and placed her in Lycia.
 
The Bibliotheca (Library) of Pseudo-Apollodorus states that Hecuba had a son named Troilus with the god Apollo. An oracle prophesied that Troy would not be defeated if Troilus reached the age of 20 alive.  Troilus is killed by Achilles.

Hecuba is a main character in two plays by Euripides: The Trojan Women and Hecuba. The Trojan Women describes the aftermath of the fall of Troy, including Hecuba's enslavement by Odysseus. Hecuba also takes place just after the fall of Troy. Polydorus, the youngest son of Priam and Hecuba, is sent to King Polymestor for safekeeping, but when Troy falls, Polymestor murders Polydorus. Hecuba learns of this, and when Polymestor comes to the fallen city, Hecuba, by trickery, blinds him and kills his two sons.

Another story says that when she was given to Odysseus as a slave, she snarled and cursed at him, so the gods turned her into a dog, allowing her to escape.

In another tradition, Hecuba went mad upon seeing the corpses of her children Polydorus and Polyxena. Dante described this episode, which he derived from Italian sources:

   E quando la fortuna volse in basso   l'altezza de' Troian che tutto ardiva,   sì che 'nsieme col regno il re fu casso,   Ecuba trista, misera e cattiva,   poscia che vide Polissena morta,   e del suo Polidoro in su la riva   del mar si fu la dolorosa accorta,   forsennata latrò sì come cane...   And when fortune overturned the pride
   of the Trojans, who dared everything, so that
   both the king and his kingdom were destroyed,
   Poor wretched captured Hecuba,
   after she saw her Polyxena dead
   and found her Polydorus on the beach,
   was driven mad by sorrow
   and began barking like a dog...

—Inferno XXX: 13–20

Another legend has it that Hecuba threw herself into the sea and was transformed into "a she-dog with fiery eyes" and that she was buried in a "wretched" place called Kynosema ('dog's grave'), a "landmark for sailors".Koniaris, George Leonidas. "Alexander, Palamedes, Troades, Sisyphus - A Connected Tetralogy? A Connected Trilogy?". In: Harvard Studies in Classical Philology. Volume 78. Harvard University Press. 1973. pp. 120-121. The Kynosema is said to be a promontory located in modern day Kilitbahir.

 Gallery 

In popular culture
Hecuba is frequently referenced in classical literature, and in many medieval, Renaissance, and modern works. Among the works which are about Hecuba are:

 Hecuba and The Trojan Women, plays by Euripides
 The Trojan War Will Not Take Place, play by Jean Giraudoux
 King Priam, novel by David Park
 All For Hecuba (1947) an autobiography of Micheál Mac Liammóir 
 Cortege of Eagles (1967), ballet by Martha Graham
 Gilligan's Island (1967), TV series, Ep.72; to impress brash movie producer Harold Hecuba (Phil Silvers), who has crash landed on their island, the castaways perform their own musical parody version of Shakespeare's Hamlet. Passions (2000), soap opera featuring a character named Hecuba, played by Robin Strasser, who is a supernatural antagonist to the town’s resident witch 
 Trojan Barbie (2006), play by Christine Evans
 The House of Hades (2013), novel by Rick Riordan
 Troy: Fall of a City (2018) a miniseries in which Hecuba is portrayed by Frances O'Connor
 Bluey (2020) episode 2, season 2 "Hammerbarn", Hecuba features as Bingo's gnome husband

Hecuba is also referenced in other works:

 Hamlet, play by William Shakespeare. In Act 2, scene 2, the character Hamlet marvels at the skill of an actor he has just watched perform the role of Hecuba with convincing grief as she witnesses Priam's death:  "What's Hecuba to him, or he to Hecuba, / That he should weep for her?"  Hamlet criticizes himself for grieving his father less authentically than the actor does on behalf of the imaginary Hecuba and Priam.
  In Fortune Plango Vulnera (I Bemoan The Wounds Of Fortune), from the 13th C Latin and Goliardic poetry collection Carmina Burana, which was set to  music in the movement Fate Imperatrix Mundi of Carmina Burana: Cantiones profanae cantoribus et choris cantandae comitantibus instrumentis atque imaginibus magicis by Carl Orff, Hecuba is mentioned as an exemplar of those thrown down by fate and a warning: "Nam sub axe legimus, Hecubam reginam." (For beneath the axle is written, queen Hecuba)

• In Edith Wharton’s The Custom of the Country, she describes Mrs. Spragg as “gaz[ing]after [Undine and Mr. Spragg] with the pale stare of Hecuba.”

 Notes 

 References 

 Primary sources 
 Virgil, Aeneid III.19–68
 Homer, Iliad XIV.717–718
 Solinus, De vita Caesarum X.22
 Lactantius, Divinae institutions I.22
 Pomponius Mela, De chorographia II.26
 Ovid, Metamorphoses XIII.423–450, 481–571
 Euripides, Trojan Women Euripides, Hecuba

 Secondary sources 
 Tsotakou-Karveli. Lexicon of Greek Mythology''. Athens: Sokoli, 1990.

External links

 

Queens in Greek mythology
Princesses in Greek mythology
Children of Potamoi
Women of Apollo
Women of the Trojan war
Trojans
Metamorphoses into animals in Greek mythology
Metamorphoses characters
Priam
Mythological dogs
Suicides in Greek mythology